Bengali Americans are Americans of Bengali ethnic, cultural and linguistic heritage and identity. They trace their ancestry to the historic ethnolinguistic region of Bengal in South Asia (now divided between Bangladesh and India). Bengali Americans are also a subgroup of Bangladeshi Americans and Indian Americans. Bengalis are also classified under Bangladeshi Americans. Significant immigration of Bengalis to the United States started after 1965.

Bengali Americans may refer to:
 Bangladeshi Americans, Americans of Bangladeshi descent of Bengali Muslims. Bengali Muslims are usually classified as Bangladeshi Americans and American Muslims.
 Bengali Indian Americans, Americans of Indian and Bengali Hindu descent whose ancestral origins are in West Bengal, Bangladesh or erstwhile East Bengal, Jharkhand, Purnia, Odisha, Goalpara region, Assam, the Barak Valley, Tripura, Nepal, Meghalaya, Rakhine state and other parts of India who are known as Probashi Bengalis. Bengali Hindu Americans also come from Southeast Asia, Europe, Australia, New Zealand, South America, Caribbean and other parts of the world.

Culture
Many Bengali Americans participate in an annual conference, the North American Bengali Conference, in order to celebrate their culture and discuss issues the community faces. They often form regional organizations to network and plan events.

Religions
Bengali Americans are mostly adherents of either Islam or Hinduism. This is manifested in the yearly celebration of Eid ul-Fitr, Durga Puja and other religious celebrations. Several secular holidays are also enjoyed by the whole community, such as the Bengali new year, Pohela Boishakh. 

There are also at least two Bengali Buddhist temples in the United States, near Washington, DC and New York City.

Notable people

 Raj Chandra Bose - Indian American Mathematician
 Moni Lal Bhoumik - Indian American physicist and a bestselling author.
 Arianna Afsar – former Miss California; placed in the Top 10 of the 2011 Miss America pageant
 Saif Ahmad – World Series of Poker winner
 Maqsudul Alam – scientist and professor
 Jalal Alamgir (d. 2011) – political scientist and professor
 Mir Masoom Ali – George and Frances Ball Distinguished Professor of Statistics, Ball State University
 Kali S. Banerjee – statistician and professor
 Rais Bhuiyan – shooting survivor and activist
 Amar Bose - founder of Bose Corporation
 Ananda Mohan Chakrabarty - scientist
 Purnendu Chatterjee - industrialist
 Subir Chowdhury – author and management consultant
 Hansen Clarke – United States Congress in 2010, from Michigan's House of Representatives
 Tarak Nath Das - anti-British Bengali Indian revolutionary and internationalist scholar
 Hasan M. Elahi – interdisciplinary media artist 
 Rajat Gupta, former CEO of McKinsey and Company
M. Zahid Hasan, the Eugene Higgins endowed chair professor at Princeton University and scientist at Lawrence Berkeley National Laboratory, known for ground-breaking discoveries in the quantum world 
 Fazle Hussain – professor of mechanical engineering, physics, and earth science at the University of Houston
 Abul Hussam – inventor of the Sono arsenic filter
 Norah Jones - singer and actress
 Mindy Kaling- actress
 Jawed Karim – co-founder of YouTube; designed key parts of PayPal
 Mohammad Ataul Karim – electrical engineer
 Sumaya Kazi – founder of Sumazi, was recognised by BusinessWeek as one of America's Best Young Entrepreneurs
 Abdus Suttar Khan – chemist and jet fuels inventor
 Fazlur Rahman Khan – pioneer of modern structural engineering
 Salman Khan – founder of Khan Academy, a nonprofit educational organisation
 Jhumpa Lahiri - author of The Namesake
 Dipa Ma – Vipassana meditation founder in the US
 Tasmin Mahfuz - American television journalist and news anchor and Gracie award recipient for women.
 Sezan Mahmud – award-winning novelist
 A.K. Mozumdar - first person of South Asian descent to earn US citizenship, until it was revoked by the Supreme Court in 1924
 Dhan Gopal Mukerji, first South Asian winner of Newbery Medal in 1928
 Raj Mukherji, Majority Whip of the New Jersey General Assembly
 Shomi Patwary – designer and music video director
 Iqbal Quadir – founder of Grameenphone, Bangladesh's largest mobile phone company; heads the Legatum Center at MIT
 Kamal Quadir – entrepreneur; founded two of Bangladesh's key technology companies, CellBazaar and bKash
 Anika Rahman – CEO of Ms. Foundation for Women
 Badal Roy – tabla player, percussionist, and recording artist
 Reihan Salam – conservative American political commentator; blogger at The American Scene; associate editor of The Atlantic Monthly
 Shikhee – singer; auteur of industrial band Android Lust
 Asif Azam Siddiqi – space historian; assistant professor of history at Fordham University
 M. Osman Siddique – former US ambassador
 Palbasha Siddique – singer
 Narasingha Sil – professor of history at Western Oregon University
 Monica Yunus – Bangladeshi-Russian-American operatic soprano
Sohla El-Waylly – American chef, restaurateur, and YouTube personality as part of Bon Appetit’s staff.
 Samarendra Nath Roy - Indian American Mathematician

References